Analysis and Applications is a journal covering mathematical analysis and its application to the physical and biological sciences and engineering. It was first published in 2003 by World Scientific. The journal aims "to encourage the development of new techniques and results in applied analysis".

Abstracting and indexing
The journal is abstracted and indexed in:
 Zentralblatt MATH
 Mathematical Reviews
 Science Citation Index Expanded
 Current Contents/Physical, Chemical and Earth Sciences
 Journal Citation Reports/Science Edition
 Inspec

References

External links
 AA Journal Website

Mathematics journals
Publications established in 2003
English-language journals
World Scientific academic journals